Muhandiram was a post in the native headmen system in the lower-country (coastal districts) of Ceylon (Sri Lanka) during the colonial era. It was awarded as a title of honor until suspension of Ceylonese honours in 1956.

History
The post originated from the Portuguese colonial administration in the 17th century by enlisting natives of different castes from the coastal areas. The post continued throughout the Dutch East India Company administration and the British colonial administration until the abolition of the native department in the 1930s. It was awarded as a title of honor until the suspension of Celonese honors in 1956.

During the British administration official and titular appointments were made by the government agent of the district to a korale which was a revenue district; a muhandiram had several vidane arachchies that may come under his supervision. He would report to the mudaliyar of the korale or atapattu (district) and was subordinate to the assistant government agents and other civil servants. Appointments were non-transferable and usually hereditary, made to locals, usually from wealthy influential families loyal to the British Crown. This was an influential post, as the holder had much control over the populace of a korale and wielded quasi-judicial powers since he was responsible for keeping the peace, carrying out revenue collection and assisting in judicial functions.

Their uniform was similar to that of the mudaliyars, with a long black tunic buttoned up to the neck with golden loops and buttons, a gold lave sword belt and decorated sword.

Ranks of the British Muhandirams
Muhandirams had several classes:

Awarded as an honor (titular)
Muhandiram of the Governor's Gate (titular) - awarded as an Honor 
Muhandiram (titular) - awarded as an Honor
Vidane Muhandirams (titular) - awarded as an Honor
Veda Muhandirams (titular) - awarded as an honor for native physicians
Guru Muhandirams (titular) - awarded as an honor for native teachers

Official 
Muhandiram of the atapattu - in charge of a jurisdiction of a district 
Muhandiram of the korale - in charge of a jurisdiction of a korale

Ex-offico posts attached to other public departments or ceremonial roles
Gravets muhandiram - jurisdiction of a town and gravets
Basnayaka muhandiram - command of a Lascoreen Guard 
Liyana muhandiram - head of the clerks
Madige muhandiram - regional transportation representative for the governor

Singular appointments  
Padikara muhandiram
Mohotti muhandiram
Dadayakkare muhandiram

List of prominent Muhandirams

Official

Madige Muhandiram
 Madige Muhandiram M. K. Abdul Hameed of Kurunegala
Madige Muhandiram Galagaha Vidanalagegedara Seyed Mohamed Lebbe Marikar (1840-1939) of Kandy
Madige Muhandiram Mohammed Salie of Kotiyakumbura
Madige Muhandiram Haji Marikkar Travala (d:1817) of Wellassa - Killed by rebels during the Great Rebellion of 1817–18

Awarded as an honor (titular)

Muhandiram of the Governor's Gate 
Gate Muhandiram Arnold Paul Goonewardene of Kalutara
Gate Muhandiram Peter Thomas de Saram Wirasinghe Siriwardena (1853-1910) of Mount Lavinia

Muhandiram
 Padikara Muhandiram Don Pedris Francis Abeywickrama (1886-1966) of Morawaka Korale. Writer and Poet.
Muhandiram Tuan Kitchil AbuCassim Burah 
 Muhandiram James Alfred Corea (1871 - ?) of Madampe
Muhandiram Andiris Perera Dharmagunawardhana (1809–1890)
Muhandiram Auwakkar Isse of Sammanthurai 
 Muhandiram T. Sathasiva Iyer (1882 - 1950)
Muhandiram M. K. Mahmood Lebbe alias Thalama of Ibbagamuwa. (1910-1981)
 Muhandiram Ibra Lebbe Sulaiman Lebbe (1893 - 1964) of Kurikotuwa Maddeketiya Korale
 Muhandiram Don Justin Peter Senarathna (1899-1985)
Muhandiram Brahmanawatte Mawathage Lloyd Seneviratne - Founding Chairman of Dehiwela Mt Lavinia Council

See also
Native headmen of Ceylon
 Mudaliyar
 Arachchi
Walauwa
Kastane

References

 
British Ceylon period
British Ceylon
Defunct government positions in Sri Lanka